St. Stephen's Episcopal Church is a historic Episcopal church at 1 Grove Street in Schuylerville, Saratoga County, New York.  It was built in 1868 and is a cruciform plan church building in the Gothic Revival style. It is built of quarry faced stone block laid in random ashlar. It features a steeply pitched gable roof and polygonal steeple, both covered in ornate polychrome slate.

It was listed on the National Register of Historic Places in 2005.

References

External links
St. Stephen's Episcopal Church website

Episcopal church buildings in New York (state)
Churches on the National Register of Historic Places in New York (state)
Gothic Revival church buildings in New York (state)
Churches completed in 1838
19th-century Episcopal church buildings
Churches in Saratoga County, New York
National Register of Historic Places in Saratoga County, New York